Rajendra Bothra is an American surgeon, humanitarian and politician of Indian origin. He is a former Chief of Surgery at the Holy Cross Hospital, Detroit and practices interventional pain management at the Pain Centre USA, Warren. He is a Fellow of the American Board of Interventional Pain Physicians (ABIPP) and is associated with Indian health organizations in conducting lectures to raise awareness of HIV/AIDS and substance abuse. He is politically aligned with the Republican Party and was appointed by George H. W. Bush as the co-chairman of the Asian-American Coalition for the 1988 United States presidential election. He was awarded the fourth highest civilian award of the Padma Shri, by the Government of India, in 1999.

On December 6, 2018, Dr Bothra and five other physicians at The Pain Center USA were indicted for healthcare fraud and released on bond pending trial, but in 2019, Dr Bothra was taken into federal custody for misrepresenting information about his relatives, trips abroad, and assets, and he has remained in custody pending trial due to flight risk; Dr Bothra has since filed 8 motions to revoke his detention and appealed the denials 6 times. He is accused of fueling the nation's opioid epidemic, cheating Medicare and subjecting patients to needless, painful back injections. He was acquitted on all charges on June 29th, 2022.

See also 
 Interventional pain management
 1988 United States presidential election

References 

American surgeons
American pain physicians
Recipients of the Padma Shri in medicine
American politicians of Indian descent
Republican Party (United States) politicians
Michigan Republicans
Living people
Year of birth missing (living people)